Saint Junian is the name of:
Junian of Saint-Junien (born c. 480), after whom the commune Saint-Junien is named
Junian of Mairé (died 587), of the Poitou region

See also
Saint-Junien, commune